Trendyol is an e-commerce platform based in Turkey, with its headquarters located in Istanbul. Trendyol operates in Trendyol Group structure. Founded in 2010 by Demet Mutlu, Trendyol is a private company, specialising in the fashion and retail sector.

In August 2021, Trendyol entered into agreements to raise $1.5 billion from a number of high-profile investors, valuing the company at $16.5 billion. With this new funding, Trendyol becomes Turkey’s first decacorn (the term given for start-up companies which have a valuation of over $10 billion). The round was co-led by General Atlantic, SoftBank Vision Fund 2, as well as Princeville Capital and sovereign wealth funds, ADQ (UAE) and Qatar Investment Authority.

Group Companies

Trendyol Tech
The platform was approved as a research and development centre in 2019 by the Ministry of Industry and Technology. Trendyol Tech specialises in the following: native language processing; real-time data analysis; machine learning; deep learning; image processing; data visualisation; text simulation and big data.

Dolap 
Dolap was founded in 2016 as a second-hand product trading platform and acquired by Trendyol in 2018. 1.4 million individual sellers are currently active on Dolap.

Trendyol Express 
Founded as a delivery network in 2018.

Investors 
Founded with an initial capital of 300 thousand USD, Trendyol received investment from Tiger Global and Kleiner Perkins in 2010-2011 and EBRD in 2014.  Alibaba Group became a shareholder of Trendyol in 2018. Following the investment made by Alibaba, Tiger Global, Kleiner Perkins Caufield Byers, and EBRD were withdrawn. Alibaba became a shareholder of the company by acquiring the shares of 3 international shareholders in Trendyol. In August 2021, Trendyol had entered into agreements to raise $1.5 billion from a number of high-profile investors, valuing the company at $16.5 billion. The round was co-led by General Atlantic, SoftBank Vision Fund 2, as well as Princeville Capital and sovereign wealth funds, ADQ (UAE) and the Qatar Investment Authority, the company said in a statement. Thus, while Trendyol’s valuation increased to 16.5 billion dollars, the company was upgraded to the ‘decacorn’ category, which is used for companies with a valuation exceeding 10 billion dollars.

References

Online retailers of Turkey
Retail companies established in 2010
Internet properties established in 2010
2010 establishments in Turkey